Radoslav Rangelov (born 18 September 1985) is a Bulgarian footballer, currently playing for as a midfielder.

External links
Profile at footballdatabase.eu

1985 births
Living people
Bulgarian footballers
Association football midfielders
First Professional Football League (Bulgaria) players
PFC Slavia Sofia players